Patsy is a character in the film Monty Python and the Holy Grail and the musical Spamalot. He is played by Terry Gilliam in Monty Python and The Holy Grail. Serving as King Arthur's assistant, he only has a few simple tasks throughout the entire film, such as using two halves of a coconut to simulate the hoofbeats of Arthur's nonexistent horse.

He also announces King Arthur's arrival by trumpet, as when Arthur's group approaches a castle inhabited by French soldiers early in the movie. Patsy has only one line in the film: "It's only a model," said when the Knights of the Round Table first catch sight of the castle at Camelot.

Patsy's fate is left ambiguous in the film; he disappears after King Arthur encounters Tim the Enchanter, and is not seen again.

In the 2005 musical, Spamalot, Patsy has a bigger role  with many more lines, and he sings "Always Look on the Bright Side of Life" from Monty Python's Life of Brian to King Arthur, and they later sing "I'm All Alone". As in the film, Patsy follows King Arthur everywhere and bangs coconut shells together to simulate the sound of Arthur's horse. In the original Broadway production, he was played by Michael McGrath, who impersonated Terry Gilliam's role in the film. McGrath's role in the musical was praised in reviews, and he was nominated for the 2005 Tony Award for Best Featured Actor in a Musical for Spamalot. In the musical, Patsy is half Jewish. He didn't mention this at first because "it's just not the kind of thing you say to a heavily armed Christian." King Arthur also refers to him as "family."

References 

Monty Python and the Holy Grail
Monty Python characters
Film characters introduced in 1974
Comedy film characters
Musical theatre characters
Fictional servants